The Marvel Family, also known as the Shazam Family (also Shazamily), are a group of superheroes who originally appeared in books published by Fawcett Comics and were later acquired by DC Comics. Created in 1942 by writer Otto Binder and artist Marc Swayze, the team was created as an extension of Fawcett's Captain Marvel franchise, and included Marvel's sister Mary Marvel, their friend Captain Marvel Jr., and, at various times, a number of other characters as well.

Because Marvel Comics trademarked their own Captain Marvel comic book during the interim between the demise of the Fawcett Comics' Captain Marvel comics in 1953 and DC's revival in 1972, DC Comics is today unable to promote and market Captain Marvel under that name. Since 1972, DC has instead used the trademark Shazam! for their comic book titles with the Marvel Family characters, and the name under which they market and promote the characters. When referring to the Marvel Family on comic book covers or various merchandise, they are by this legal necessity called the "Shazam Family".

In 2012, DC officially changed Captain Marvel's name to Shazam, making Shazam Family the name of the superhero's associates. In current continuity, the Shazam Family comprises the superpowered alter egos of Billy Batson (teenaged alter-ego of Shazam, formerly Captain Marvel) and his foster siblings: Mary Bromfield (formerly Mary Marvel), Freddy Freeman (formerly Captain Marvel Jr.), Darla Dudley, Pedro Peña, and Eugene Choi.

The Shazam Family made their cinematic debut in the DC Extended Universe film Shazam!, released in 2019 by New Line Cinema and Warner Bros., and they are set to return for a sequel film, Shazam! Fury of the Gods, in 2023.

Publication history
The Marvel Family was established in 1942 after the introductions of Captain Marvel's partners, the Lieutenant Marvels (Whiz Comics #21, September 1941), Captain Marvel Jr. (Whiz Comics #25, December 1941) and Mary Marvel (Captain Marvel Adventures #18, December 1942). With Junior and Mary's additions to his adventures, Captain Marvel became the first superhero to have a team of sidekicks who share his powers, abilities, and appearance; a concept later adapted for heroes such as Superman and Aquaman, among others.

The members of the Marvel Family appeared both separately and together in many of Fawcett's comic book series, including Whiz Comics, Wow Comics, Master Comics, Captain Marvel Adventures, Captain Marvel Jr., Mary Marvel, and The Marvel Family. By the late 1940s, Marvel Family comics were among the most popular in the industry, and the Marvel Family had expanded to include both non-superpowered characters (Uncle Marvel and Freckles Marvel) and even talking animals (Hoppy the Marvel Bunny). By 1953, all of these books had ceased publication, due to Superman publisher DC Comics' lawsuit against Fawcett.

In 1972, DC licensed the rights to the Marvel Family characters, and began publishing them in a comic series titled Shazam!. Fawcett sold DC the rights to the characters in 1980, by which time Shazam! had been cancelled, and the Marvels had been relegated the back-up feature of World's Finest Comics, and, later, Adventure Comics. DC retconned Captain Marvel in 1986 with their Legends miniseries, establishing him as a solo hero without a team. Writer/artist Jerry Ordway resurrected the Marvel Family in 1995 with his Power of Shazam! series, establishing the team as being made up solely of Captain Marvel, Mary Marvel and Captain Marvel, Jr. Following several attempts at relaunching the Shazam! franchise during the mid-2000s, the Marvel Family was temporarily dissolved by writers Geoff Johns and Jerry Ordway in Justice Society of America (vol. 3) #25, with only Captain Marvel Jr., now known as Shazam, retaining his powers, but from another source. In the interim, Captain Marvel and Mary Marvel continued to appear in Billy Batson and the Magic of Shazam!, an all-ages comic book series published under DC's youth-oriented Johnny DC line which ran from 2008 to 2010. Captain Marvel Jr. joined the pair towards the end of the run of Magic of Shazam!, following a brief period serving as the sidekick of the Marvels' enemy under the name Black Adam Jr.

The Shazam Family was reintroduced during DC Comics' continuity-altering Flashpoint miniseries in 2011, as six kids who all spoke "Shazam!" in unison to become one superhero, Captain Thunder. In the later company-wide "New 52" reboot that followed Flashpoint, the Captain Marvel character was renamed "Shazam" and starred in a backup segment of the Justice League series (second volume) from 2012 to 2013. These backups, by writer Geoff Johns and artist Gary Frank, introduced Billy Batson/Shazam and his new Shazam Family, consisting of Billy and his five foster siblings, with whom he shares his powers.

In 2022, DC published a facsimile edition of Marvel Family Comics No. 1 as a tie-in with the release of the film Black Adam.

Marvel/Shazam Family members

Primary members

Billy Batson (Captain Marvel/Shazam)

The "World's Mightiest Mortal", Captain Marvel is the superpowered alter-ego of Billy Batson, an orphaned boy who speaks the name of the wizard Shazam to become an adult superhero. Billy has the powers of Solomon (wisdom), Hercules (strength), Atlas (stamina), Zeus (power), Achilles (courage), and Mercury (speed); and served as the wizard Shazam's champion and herald.

In the Golden Age and Bronze Age comics, Billy chose to share his powers with his sister Mary and his friend Freddy Freeman, creating the Marvel Family. Outside of the Marvel Family, Captain Marvel served briefly as a member of both the Justice League International and the Justice Society of America.

After the 2011 New 52 reboot of the Shazam! characters by Geoff Johns & Gary Frank, Billy Batson is a troubled foster child who has inherited the name, powers, and seat on the council of magic of the wizard Shazam. Becoming a hero inspired the initially brash and standoffish Billy to evolve into a noble hero and leader who embraces his new foster family. As Shazam, Billy has powers and a red-uniformed appearance similar to the traditional version of Captain Marvel with the added ability to wield magic via the "living lightning" that powers him.

Mary Bromfield (Mary Marvel/Lady Shazam)

In traditional Shazam! stories, Mary is Billy's once-lost twin sister Mary Batson. She is technically the oldest in the pair (adopted as Mary Bromfield), who found she could say the magic word "Shazam!" and become a Marvel as well. The Golden Age Mary Marvel remained a teenager in superhero form, while the modern version is transformed into an adult like her brother. The Golden Age Mary Marvel had a different set of patrons from Captain Marvel who contributed to her powers. They were Selene (grace), Hippolyte (strength), Ariadne (skill), Zephyrus (swiftness), Aurora (beauty) and Minerva (wisdom).

During the 2007 and 2008 limited series Countdown to Final Crisis and Final Crisis, Mary Marvel lost her powers and gained the powers of Marvel Family foe Black Adam. She temporarily became a villain working for Darkseid and possessed by the New God Desaad.

In current DC Comics continuity from 2012 on, Mary Bromfield is Billy Batson's foster sister, having run away from an abusive home at a young age and being placed in the Vázquez home. The oldest of the Shazam kids, Mary acts as the "den mother" and conscience of the group. She shares Billy's secret, and by saying "Shazam!" she can gain a superpowered form similar to the traditional Mary Marvel in a red uniform.

Freddy Freeman (Captain Marvel Jr./Shazam Jr.)

In both the Golden Age and 1990s versions of the Marvel Family, Billy's friend and classmate, Freddy Freeman, was attacked and left disabled by the supervillain Captain Nazi, and was given the power to become a Marvel to save his life. Whenever he spoke Captain Marvel's name, Freddy becomes a teenage version of Captain Marvel. This created the odd problem that he could not identify himself without changing back to his regular form.

During the mid-1990s, the Freddy character went by the alias CM3 (short for "Captain Marvel Three", "CM1" being Billy and "CM2" being Mary) so that he could identify himself without transforming. He was a member of the Teen Titans during the late 1990s and later, the Outsiders in the early 2000s. The 2006–2008 Trials of Shazam! mini-series featured Freddy gaining the powers of Captain Marvel as Shazam, while Billy took over for the dead wizard Shazam as Marvel.

In current DC Comics continuity from 2012 on, Freddy Freeman (now a blond teenager instead of the traditional black-haired youth, though still physically disabled) is Billy Batson's foster brother, a smart-mouthed pickpocket and trickster whose parents are in prison. He shares Billy's secret and by saying "Shazam!" can gain a form similar to an adult version of the traditional Captain Marvel, Jr., in a blue uniform.

Eugene Choi
Eugene Choi is Billy Batson's foster brother, an intelligent, bookish teenager about his age of Asian descent with a love of technology and video games. Eugene's bookishness is offset by a competitive and impulsive nature that causes trouble for him and the others at times. Introduced in the Flashpoint miniseries, Eugene can share Billy's power by saying "Shazam!" and become an adult Shazam-powered version of himself in a silver/gray uniform.

In addition to the standard Shazam power-set, Eugene has the additional power of technopathy, which allows him to talk to and control machines and technology.

Pedro Peña
Pedro Peña is Billy Batson's foster brother, an overweight teenager of Mexican descent who is around Billy's age. Introduced in the Flashpoint miniseries, Pedro can share Billy's power by saying "Shazam!" and becoming an adult Shazam-powered version of himself in a green uniform. Pedro's adult form, resembling a tall, bearded powerlifter, is a stark contrast to his personal insecurity and shyness. While the comics have yet to make any such distinction, the 2019 live-action feature film Shazam! implies that Pedro is gay or asexual, and later confirmed to be gay by the Shazam! Fury of the Gods screenwriter Henry Gayden.

In superhuman form, Pedro has extra amounts of super-strength compared to the rest of the Shazam Family, gaining the strenght of Hercules.

Darla Dudley
Darla Dudley is Billy Batson's foster sister, an exuberant African-American preteen who was abandoned by her parents and adopted by Billy's foster parents, the Vásquezes. Despite her hardships growing up, Darla is very openly affectionate and loving towards her foster family and virtually anyone she meets. Introduced in the Flashpoint miniseries (as a teenager the same age as the other kids), Darla can share Billy's power by saying "Shazam!"

She wears a purple uniform, and her speed abilities are amplified, making her faster than the others. She is also unable to keep secrets, which proved rather difficult to overcome.

Past members

The Lieutenant Marvels

The Lieutenant Marvels are three other boys named "Billy Batson" (nicknamed "Tall Billy", "Fat Billy" and "Hill Billy" — the last because he was from the Appalachian Mountains — to differentiate themselves from "Real Billy", Captain Marvel) who learned that, because they also were named Billy Batson, they could draw on the power of Shazam. They vowed only to use their power if asked by Captain Marvel, and only if all three were to say the magic word, "SHAZAM!" in unison.

They did not appear in Marvel Family stories between Crisis on Infinite Earths in 1985 and Flashpoint in 2011, except for a scene in The Trials of Shazam! #2 (2006) where they briefly appeared, only to lose their powers.

Following DC's 2011 New 52 reboot, the Lieutenant Marvels appear as non-superpowered allies of the Marvel Family in the 2015 one-shot comic The Multiversity: Thunderworld, where they, Mister Tawny, and Uncle Marvel help defeat the Monster Society of Evil while Captain Marvel is fighting Doctor Sivana for control of the Rock of Eternity.

C.C. Batson & Marilyn Batson
Clarence Charles "C.C." Batson (named after Captain Marvel co-creator Charles Clarence "C.C." Beck) is the biological father of Billy Batson. Billy's biological parents had been alluded to in a handful of Shazam! stories published prior to 1990 under different names. The 1994 graphic novel The Power of Shazam! by Jerry Ordway introduces C.C. and his wife, Billy's mother Marilyn, and how their deaths in that Post-Crisis continuity at the hands of Theo Adam (alter-ego of Black Adam) led to Billy gaining his powers. Much emphasis is made of Captain Marvel/Shazam's almost-identical appearance to the deceased C.C. Batson.

In a story arc from the subsequent The Power of Shazam! ongoing series (issues 24-27, 1997), Dr. Sivana sneaks into the timestream outside of the Rock of Eternity and alters the timeline so that Theo Adam never kills the Batsons. Instead, Marilyn and C.C. themselves become the heirs to Shazam's power as the Captains Marvel, while Billy and Mary remain typical, upper-middle-class teenagers. C.C. himself is employed by the Wizard Shazam and Waverider to correct the timestream by stopping Sivana from making his changes.

In current DC Rebirth continuity, C.C. Batson is still alive, resembling an older Captain Marvel/Shazam with greying hair. As a younger man, C.C. had abandoned Marilyn and Billy when Billy was a toddler and become a grifter. After spending a decade in prison, C.C. returns to Philadelphia to find Billy at the Vazquezes' foster home. When he is attacked by Black Adam and the Seven Deadly Sins, Billy shares his Shazam powers with his father, making him the prophesied seventh and final member of the Shazam Family. In superhero form, C.C. Batson wears a yellow/gold costume with red trim (an inverse of the colors of Billy's costume).

However, it is revealed that C.C. Batson had been possessed by Mister Mind since his prison release, who intended to uses the Shazam powers in a plot to unite the Seven Magiclands under his rule. Using a spell, Shazam shrinks himself down small enough to enter his father's ear canal and battle the worm directly. Following Mind's defeat, C.C. loses his powers and is freed from Mind's control, but reveals that he has no intentions of actually reuniting with his son.

Other members
These members of the Marvel Family appear in stories set in the future.
Hoppy the Marvel Bunny is a spin-off character generally confined to his own series, the pink talking rabbit version of Captain Marvel periodically assisted the human Marvels in their adventures.
 Thunder: The star of The Power of Shazam! Annual 1996, Thunder is the super-powered alter-ego of a young girl from the planet Binderaan, circa 9,000 A.D., named CeCe Beck (or Beck for short). An aged Captain Marvel serves as the girl's mentor the same way Shazam served as his mentor. Whenever Beck speaks the magic words "Captain Marvel", she is transformed into Thunder, an adult super-heroine. After being lost in the timestream, Thunder briefly teamed up with the Legion of Super-Heroes in the 30th century. The names "CeCe Beck" and "Binderaan" are tributes to Marvel Family creators C.C. Beck and Otto Binder.
 Tanist: A teenaged male Marvel who appeared in The Power of Shazam! #1,000,000 (November 1998, part of the DC One Million event). After his mother is killed, Tanist, a disabled resident of Mercury in the 853rd century, meets the aged Captain Marvel in the Rock of Eternity. Marvel grants the boy superpowers to save his life as he had done for Freddy Freeman/Captain Marvel Jr.

Black Marvel Family members

The Black Marvel Family, a variant of the Marvel Family concept with Captain Marvel's archvillain Black Adam as the central focus, was introduced in the pages of the weekly DC comic book 52.

Black Adam

An older Egyptian renegade protégé of the wizard Shazam, who was the first to be granted superpowers by the wizard. Adam eventually grew to abuse his power, and became a tyrant. Shazam returned to punish Adam with either exile into deep space (in the original Fawcett Comics) or death (in the modern DC Comics). He returns to Earth (or life) after Shazam appoints Captain Marvel his new successor, and was soon established as Captain Marvel's most powerful foe in physical abilities. In later DC continuity, Black Adam joined the Justice Society of America, claiming to have reformed, later turning on the Justice Society by using some of its younger associates to help him overthrow the government of his home country, the mythical Kahndaq.

Adam was one of the main characters in DC's 52 weekly maxi-series, which followed his attempts to establish himself as a hero, which led him to create a "Marvel Family" of his own, which included his superpowered wife Isis and his own "Captain Marvel Jr.", Osiris.

In the current "New 52" continuity, Black Adam was a former Kahndaqi slave in ancient times who was granted the power of Shazam along with his young nephew, whom he kills for not sharing his taste for vengeance against their enemies. Adam kills the members of Earth's Council of Wizards save for the wizard Shazam, who imprisoned him and hid the magic until Adam was freed by Doctor Sivana in modern times.

Isis

The superheroine Isis was originally created for live-action television to star in Filmation's The Secrets of Isis TV show, a sister series for Filmation's adaptation of !. Isis teamed up with Captain Marvel on occasion in both television and comics, and briefly starred in a licensed DC comic book in the late 1970s.

In 2006, DC Comics created a new, unrelated Isis and introduced her into the DC Universe. This Isis is the alter-ego of Adrianna Tomaz, originally a slave from Egypt offered to Black Adam by the terrorist group Intergang as a token to curry his favor. Although Adam dealt harshly with the slavers and kills one of them, Adrianna becomes Adam's love interest and made him a more merciful figure, and was granted a special amulet that allowed her to become the avatar of the Egyptian goddess. Adam married Isis, but her death at the hands of the Four Horsemen of Apokolips drove him to a fit of mass murder. At the end of the Black Adam: The Dark Age mini-series in 2007, Isis was resurrected by Felix Faust. However, the ordeal of her death, and many months spent as a brainwashed slave, routinely abused by Faust, left her much colder and ruthless than before, making her even less merciful than her husband.

In current "New 52" continuity, Adrianna Tomaz is a peaceful freedom fighter who helps her brother Amon resurrect Black Adam after his defeat at the hands of the superhero Shazam.

Osiris

The teenaged Osiris is Amon Tomaz, Adrianna's long-lost brother who was kidnapped, enslaved, and crippled by Intergang. Adam shared his powers with Amon, allowing him to transform into the superpowered Osiris by saying the name "Black Adam". Osiris was murdered by his trusted companion, Sobek the talking crocodile, revealed to be Famine, one of the Four Horsemen. During the 2009-2010 crossover event Blackest Night, Osiris was resurrected alongside other heroes, and was later resurrected as a White Lantern, for the purpose of releasing Isis, for which he joins the new Titans.

In current "New 52" continuity, Amon Tomaz is a rebellious freedom fighter who helps resurrect Black Adam after his defeat at the hands of the superhero Shazam.

Sobek
Sobek is an intelligent humanoid crocodile, created and abandoned by the Sivana Family, who befriends the Black Marvel family during the 52 maxi-series after escaping from his cage at the Sivana compound. Despite his monstrous appearance, the character is portrayed as timid, meek, and good-natured, making him the Black Marvel Family's analogue to Tawky Tawny. Sobek reveals a more horrifying side in 52 Week 43, when he convinced a distraught Osiris to change into his mortal form, then suddenly killed and devoured him. Sobek was revealed in Week 44 to be the Fourth Horseman, Famine. He appeared to have been killed by Black Adam both in self-defense and revenge, but reappears in the 52 Aftermath: The Four Horsemen mini-series reincarnated as a humanoid hyena with cybernetic parts.

Marvel Family allies

Introduced during the Golden Age (1939-1953)
 The Wizard Shazam - Although he is killed as prophesied after giving Billy the power to become Captain Marvel, Shazam's spirit remains as the vigilant caretaker of the Rock of Eternity. His power level varies in different stories from high-level magician to godlike. In the 1990s-2000s continuity, Shazam does not die after granting Billy his powers, and was a much more active character than he was during the Golden Age Marvel Family adventures. In current continuity, Shazam - known to most as only "The Wizard," whose true name is Mamaragan - was one of the first humans on Earth to wield magic in ancient times, and becomes the head chair of the Council of Eternity. After the betrayal of Black Adam, Shazam's compatriots on the Council are murdered, and as the remaining member, he imprisons Adam and hides magic from the world. When Adam is freed by Doctor Sivana in modern times, Shazam drafts Billy Batson as his successor.
 Mr. Sterling Morris - The President of Amalgamated Broadcasting, owners of Station WHIZ, the radio (and later TV) station for which Billy Batson works. He debuts in the very first Captain Marvel story in Whiz Comics #2.
 Beautia and Magnificus Sivana - Dr. Sivana's beautiful adult daughter Beautia shared her father's passion for world domination until meeting, and falling for, Captain Marvel. She has an unrequited crush on the shy Captain, not realizing that he is actually only a young boy. Beautia first appeared in Whiz Comics #3b in 1940. Most Golden Age Marvel Family stories feature Beautia as Dr. Sivana's unwitting assistant, who betrays her father to assist the heroes. Her older brother Magnificus is also generally depicted as a Marvel Family ally, although in his only Golden Age appearance (Whiz Comics #15, 1941), Magnificus was super-strong and fought Captain Marvel hand-to-hand at his father's request.
 "Muscles" McGinnis - The antagonist of a story included in Captain Marvel Adventures #3 (1941), the toughest gangster of the city possessing enormous strength. "Muscles" McGinnis promises to go straight after being defeated by Captain Marvel when he tries to take over Station WHIZ, as he feels the side opposing crime is much stronger. The character was reintroduced as a recurring character in the Power of Shazam! series of the 1990s, in which "Muscles" had indeed reformed to become an undercover cop and a frequent ally of Captain Marvel.
 Steamboat - In the 1940s Fawcett stories, Steamboat is Billy Batson's African-American valet. Depicted as cowardly and subservient, Steamboat accompanied Billy and Captain Marvel on many of their adventures following his first appearance in America's Greatest Comics #3 in 1941. Drawn in a racially stereotyped manner and speaking with a stereotypical Negro dialect, Steamboat was retired from the Captain Marvel stories after the Youth Builders, a diverse group of New York City and Philadelphia area students, protested the use of the character in 1945.
 Cissie Sommerly - Billy Batson's girlfriend and Sterling Morris' niece. She first appears in Captain Marvel Adventures #12 (1942). Billy immediately fell in love with her at first sight, soon growing close to each other; she had a very positive and cheerful personality, and sang certain words when talking to Billy in her first appearances in the original comics. Her last name was originally spelled Summerly before they changed it replacing the U with an O, and she also had a brother named Pete. She didn't have a full status role in Billy's life, only recurring; but whenever she and Billy got together, they always cared about each other deeply' and whenever they encountered danger, Billy would secretly transform into Captain Marvel and save her. After she and all the other Fawcett characters were acquired by DC, She spent some more time with Billy going to the local burger store and such for the first couple of years before she was forgotten about, and years before the crisis on infinite earths storyline. She hasn't reappeared since unfortunately.
 Uncle Marvel (Uncle Dudley) - During the Golden Age, an old man named Dudley claimed that he was not only a relative of the Marvels but also a Marvel himself, although neither was true. Regardless, the Marvels took a liking to him and decided to humor his pretense, and "Uncle" Dudley became Uncle Marvel, the Marvel Family's manager. He would make his "transformation" along with one or more of the others, but not by magic; rather, by quickly removing his break-away garments (under the cover of lightning that the real Marvel(s) called down) to reveal his homemade Marvel costume underneath. He explained his lack of superpowers by claiming he suffered from "shazambago". Dudley first appeared in Wow Comics #18 in 1943. In the 1990s The Power of Shazam! comics, Dudley H. Dudley is simply a janitor at Billy's school who finds himself involved in the Marvel Family's adventures, although in one story (The Power of Shazam! #11, 1996) he was temporarily given superpowers by Shazam's ally Ibis the Invincible to help round up the escaped Seven Deadly Enemies of Man]
 Freckles Marvel (Mary Dudley) - Uncle Dudley's adopted niece, who was an irregular companion of Mary Marvel's in her Golden Age solo adventures. First appearing in Wow Comics #35 (1945), Freckles Marvel had no superpowers of her own, but wore her own Mary Marvel costume to help her super-powered friend fight crime.
 Tawky Tawny - A humanoid sapient Bengal tiger who wishes to live among the humans in civilization instead of in the wild or the zoo. As such, he is typically dressed in a tweed business suit and usually carries himself in a formal, dignified manner. Tawny first appeared in Captain Marvel Adventures #79 (1947), and became Captain Marvel's sidekick and best friend. Other variants of Tawny at DC have included a version magically animated from a stuffed tiger doll (The Power of Shazam!, 1995–99), a benevolent shapeshifter who prefers to become a tiger when appropriate (Shazam!: The Monster Society of Evil, 2007), and a tiger at the local zoo who is briefly given enhanced strength and size by Shazam (Shazam! backup feature in Justice League, 2013). The Tawky Tawny of the current-continuity Shazam! comics series hails from the Wildlands, one of the Seven Magiclands connected to the Rock of Eternity, where he strives to live among the other humanoid animals of that realm despite the discrimination and segregation pitted against tigers.

Introduced in the Bronze Age (1970-1985)
 Kid Eternity - A Golden Age hero co-created by frequent Captain Marvel writer Otto Binder for Quality Comics, first appearing in Hit Comics #25 in 1945. Kid Eternity is the alter-ego of Christopher "Kit" Freeman, a boy who is killed with his grandfather by Nazis, and, upon learning he was not meant to die, is granted the power to summon any historical or mythological figure by speaking the magic word "Eternity!" In the 1970s, Kid Eternity, acquired from Quality by DC, was integrated into the Shazam! franchise set on Earth-S, with his first appearance in a new DC story being Shazam! #28 (February 1977). Kid Eternity often joined forces with the Marvels in early-1980s Shazam! adventures from World's Finest Comics and Adventure Comics. In World's Finest Comics #279-280 (May–June 1982), Kid Eternity and Captain Marvel, Jr. learn they are long-lost brothers (a retcon made given the characters' identical surnames and similar origin stories).

Introduced after Crisis on Infinite Earths (1986-2011)
 Miss Wormwood - In the 1990s The Power of Shazam! comics, Billy's teacher (and later principal), presented as the typical "mean teacher" stereotype. She is named after Calvin's teacher in Bill Watterson's comic strip Calvin and Hobbes.
 Nick and Nora Bromfield - In the 1990s The Power of Shazam! comics, Mary Batson's adoptive parents, who adopted her through illegal means after their maid, Sarah Primm brought the child to them (Primm saved Mary from her kidnapper/Primm's brother Theo Adam). Nora Bromfield was a cousin of Billy and Mary's mother, but chose not to tell Mary about her real family. The Bromfields would eventually gain the rights to legally adopt both Mary and Billy, giving the children a traditional family structure again. The couple was named after Nick and Nora Charles of the Thin Man film series.

Introduced after Flashpoint (2011-present)
 Victor and Rosa Vasquez - The foster parents of the six kids in the Shazam Family; a working-class couple who had grown up as foster children themselves. The Vasquezes debuted in Geoff Johns & Gary Frank's 2012-13 reboot of Shazam!

Marvel Family enemies

Key villains
Besides the Black Marvel Family, the following are among the most prominent members of the Marvel Family's rogues gallery, in order of first appearance in the comics:

Doctor Sivana

Dr. Thaddeus Bodog Sivana, Sr. - "The World's Wickedest Scientist" - debuted in Whiz Comics #2 alongside Billy Batson and Captain Marvel, quickly becoming his main archenemy and most frequently recurring villain. A mad scientist who fights the Marvel Family using his genius intellect and inventions, the Golden Age Sivana had been a humanitarian scientist who bitterly fled 20th-century Europe after his inventions were ridiculed by the scientific society. Living on Venus with his four children, he became a mad scientist, bent on taking over the universe.

Other versions of Sivana in later DC Comics have positioned him as Billy Batson's wicked step-uncle (Shazam!: The New Beginning), a wealthy, wicked businessman driven to ruin by his entanglements with Black Adam (The Power of Shazam!), and the wicked Attorney General of the United States (Shazam!: The Monster Society of Evil). The current-continuity Doctor Sivana, following the 2011 reboot, is a rich scientist determined to prove the existence of magic, which leads him to free both Black Adam and Mister Mind. Sivana acquires the ability to both see magic and project magic lightning from his right eye.

During the early and mid-1940s, Dr. Sivana was often assisted, under duress, by his good-natured adult daughter Beautia (and, briefly, Sivana's oldest child, his son Magnificus). From the mid-1940s onward, his youngest children - teenaged twins Thaddeus, Jr. aka Sivana, Jr, and Georgia Sivana, both dead ringers for their father - became his henchmen as the Sivana Family. Georgia Sivana became a prominent villain for Mary Marvel, as did Sivana, Jr. for Captain Marvel, Jr.

The Seven Deadly Sins

Originally known as the "Seven Deadly Enemies of Man" and first appearing in the Whiz Comics #2 origin story in 1940, the sins are seven powerful demons held prisoner by the Wizard Shazam in his lair. The demons, whose forms vary by era and artist, sometimes escape and cause havoc through murder and using their powers to influence sin in humans.

Based upon the seven deadly sins as enumerated in the Christian faith, the original "Seven Deadly Enemies of Man" were slightly censored for suitable reading for children: Pride, Envy, Greed, Hatred, Selfishness, Laziness, and Injustice. Each demon could influence their namesake sin in human victims. Beginning with DC's JSA series in the mid-2000s, the proper Christian names/versions of the sins were used: Pride, Envy, Greed, Hatred, Sloth, Gluttony, and Lust.

Captain Nazi

Introduced in a three-part crossover between Master Comics and Whiz Comics in 1941 during World War II, Captain Nazi - real name Albrecht Krieger - is a genetically-altered Nazi who is Adolf Hitler's champion. Wearing a green costume with a swastika insignia, Captain Nazi has super-strength, near-invulnerability, and can use a special chemical gas to fly.

Created to wreak havoc on America, Captain Nazi murders an elderly man and cripples a teenage boy during his fight with Captain Marvel in Whiz Comics #25 (December 1941). The boy, Freddy Freeman, is granted powers by Captain Marvel to save his life, becoming Captain Marvel, Jr. and declaring Captain Nazi his mortal enemy.

Ibac

A frail thug named "Stinky" Printwhistle who was empowered by Lucifer himself after Lucifer saved Printwhistle from a fall caused by Captain Marvel. Printwistle is imbued with the powers of four of the most evil men to walk the face of the earth (Ivan the Terrible, Borgia, Attila the Hun and Caligula). When he says the name "IBAC", he is engulfed in green fire and brimstone and becomes a large, muscular brute with super-strength. Saying his name again transforms him back into Printwhistle (therefore, like Captain Marvel, Jr., Ibac also cannot say his own name).

Ibac first appeared in Captain Marvel Adventures #8 in 1942 and became a recurring Marvel Family villain through the characters' run in Fawcett and DC Comics. The 2011 rebooted version of Ibac is the descendant of a long line of evil despots, the first of whom - Ibac the Terrible - was known in ancient times as "the man who invented evil."

Sabbac

Similar to Ibac, Timothy Karnes is granted the powers of six demons when he says the magic word "Sabbac". As opposed to fire, Sabbac transforms via black lightning cast up (rather than down) from Hades. First appearing in Captain Marvel Jr. #4 (February 1943), Sabbac's pantheon grant him powers similar to the Marvel Family, with the added power of pyrokenesis.

A second Sabbac, Ishamel Gregor, was introduced in the mid-2000s in the Outsiders comic book. While Karnes' Sabbac became a more muscular version of himself in a green cloak with demon fangs, Gregor's Sabbac is a large, muscular, horned demon with red skin and hair.

In the 2011 Shazam! reboot, the Seven Deadly Sins have the power to possess a wicked human and transform him into a fifty-foot tall demon resembling the Ishamel Gregor version of Sabbac.

Mister Mind and the Monster Society of Evil

First appearing in Captain Marvel Adventures #22 (1943) as a disembodied voice, and later in issue #26 in his actual form, Mister Mind - "The World's Wickedest Worm" - is an evil alien caterpillar with genius intellect. Given his small stature, he wears a talkbox to communicate and is often depicted wearing eyeglasses as well. He runs the supervillain team called the Monster Society of Evil, whose membership includes most of the Marvel Family's key and recurring villains, including characters such as Doctor Sivana, King Kull, the Crocodile-Men, Captain Nazi, Mister Atom, Ibac, Jeepers, and Oggar. Mister Mind's own powers have included mind control (typically by crawling into a host's ear), telepathy, mental projection, and, once evolved into a "Hyperfly", the ability to eat time itself.

The 2011 reboot of Mister (Maxivermis) Mind presents him as a native of one of the Seven Magiclands (The Monsterlands according to Mind, The Wildlands according to rumor) who gained high-level magic powers by reading every book in the Rock of Eternity's library. His Monster Society includes creatures from across the Magiclands who had been banished to the Monsterlands' Dungeon of Eternity by the Council of Wizards. Its members include Doctor Sivana, Black Adam, the Crocodile-Men, King Kull, the Wicked Witch of the West, the Red Queen, Jeepers, Evil Eye, and Mister Atom, as well as new villains Mister Merry-Go-Round and Scapegoat.

Crocodile-Men
The Crocodile-Men (also called "Punkusians") are a race of humanoid crocodiles from the planetoid Punkus who were members of the Monster Society of Evil in Captain Marvel Adventures during the mid-1940s. There were many unnamed Crocodile-Men who just acted as henchmen for Mister Mind. One of them was one of Mister Mind's Monster Professors while the others were Monster Students.

 Herkimer - A Crocodile-Man in a business suit who is Mister Mind's second-in-command. Between the end of the Fawcett Marvel Family run in 1953 and the start of the DC Shazam! run in 1972, Herkimer reforms and gets a job as part of a carnival. In the third volume's special interlude issue that takes place before the first issue, Herkimer attacks a museum stating that the reign of the Crocodile-Men is nigh. He was mentioned to have fought Shazam before. When Freddy asks why Herkimer is in a business suit, Billy states that he didn't say. Herkimer is defeated by Shazam. Billy later mentioned his fight with him to Batman following Shazam's disastrous fight with Scarecrow where Batman mentions that he has fought Killer Croc many times. Batman does answer "No" when asked by Billy if he wears a business suit.
 Herkimer appeared in The Kid Super Power Hour with Shazam! episode "The Circus Plot", voiced by Alan Oppenheimer.
 Jorrk - The greatest scientist of the Crocodile-Men and one of Mister Mind's three lieutenants.
 Sylvester - A Crocodile-Man and one of Mister Mind's preferred gunners.

The third volume of the Shazam! comic book series, launched in 2018, introduced an unnamed three-headed Crocodile-Man in striped prison attire from the Wildlands who is a member of the Monster Society of Evil.

Oggar

A wizard who is the "World's Mightiest Immortal." Oggar was originally part of the Shazam pantheon before the Wizard, then known as "Shazamo"", dismissed him. Seeking revenge, Oggar uses his extensive magic powers to battle Shazam and his champions, though his powers cannot directly harm women and girls, allowing Mary to battle him directly. First appearing in a multi-issue arc starting with Captain Marvel Adventures #61 in 1946, Oggar recurred regularly in Shazam! stories during the 1970s and 1980s.

King Kull

The king of the Beast Men (also called the Submen), Neanderthal-like humanoids who ruled the earth in ancient times and enslaved the Homo sapiens populace. Kull fakes his death and goes into suspended animation, awakening in the modern-day and attempt to take over or destroy the world again. He possesses super-strength, near-invulnerability, and expert weaponry and military skills. Kull first appeared in Captain Marvel Adventures #125 in 1951.

Blaze and Satanus

Originally introduced in the early 1990s as Superman villains, Blaze and Satanus are powerful twin demons who are among the rules of Hades. They are also the estranged children of the Wizard Shazam, from his younger days as the ancient Canaanite superhero Vlarem The Champion. While Satanus has a soft-spot for his father and assists him from time-to-time (including giving life to Tawky Tawny), Blaze hates the Wizard and stages attacks on both him and the Marvel Family, believing the power of Shazam to be her birthright.

Other notable recurring villains

Villains introduced during the Golden Age (1939-1953)
 The Arson Fiend - First appearing in Captain Marvel Adventures #2 in 1941 as a one-shot villain, the Arson Fiend - a tall, vampire-like being with the power of pyrokinesis - was revived in the 1990s The Power of Shazam! series. He is the alter-ego of George Tweedle, a small, husky insurance salesman who transforms into the Arson Fiend using a magic salve in order to cause havoc (and boost his business).
 Mister Banjo - Kurt Filpots worked as an agent for the Axis powers during World War II. Dressed as a stout man in a baggy green suit and straw hat who carried around an old banjo with him, Filpots delivered secrets to the Japanese in the form of musical notes. Someone in a military meeting would whistle musical notes which were a code, Banjo would play the music next to a house with an agent inside who would radio them to the Japanese. Although evil, Mr. Banjo would go up against Captain Marvel with nothing more than a banjo. He first appeared in Captain Marvel Adventures #8, in the same issue as - though in a different story than - Ibac.
 Aunt Minerva - A criminal mastermind who looks like a sweet old lady, but has deadly accuracy with a gun and a desire to find a new husband after her first five died. She first appeared in Captain Marvel Adventures #59 in 1946 - in which she attempted to force Captain Marvel to marry her. Minerva recurred as a Marvel Family villain thereafter through to the 1990s.
 Aunt Minerva made an appearance in the 1979 Hanna-Barbera TV special Legends of the Superheroes, portrayed by Ruth Buzzi.
 The Three Faces of Evil - A three-headed monster - Terror, Sin, and Wickedness - imprisoned beneath or within the Rock of Eternity with the ability to hypnotize victims, even the Marvels, into doing evil. First introduced in The Marvel Family in 1947 as a humanoid three-headed monster, the later DC Comics version of the character resembles a giant hydra.
 Mister Atom - First debuting in Captain Marvel Adventures #78 in 1947, Mister Atom is a giant robot created by Dr. Charles Langley. Mister Atom's artificial intelligence malfunctions and he becomes a threat to humanity and to the Marvel Family.

Villains introduced in the Bronze Age (1970-1985)
 Chain Lightning - A young woman with the power of electrokinesis, which allows her to depower the Marvels by blasting them with lightning. First appearing in World's Finest Comics in 1981, Jerry Ordway reintroduced Chain Lightning in The Power of Shazam 15 years later as young woman with electric metahuman powers suffering from multiple personality disorder. While her main persona Amy is good-natured, her other persona Amber fuels her worst impulses and sometimes takes over her body and her powers. The other two personas are Inner Child and Id.

Other versions

In the final issue of 52, a new Multiverse is revealed, originally consisting of 52 identical realities. Among the parallel realities shown is one designated "Earth-5". As a result of Mister Mind "eating" aspects of this reality, it takes on visual aspects similar to the pre-Crisis Earth-S, including the Marvel Family characters. The names of the characters are not mentioned in the panel in which they appear, but characters visually similar to the Marvel Family appear. There is also an alternative version of Green Lantern Hal Jordan that also exists on Earth-5 alongside the Marvel Family.

Based on comments by DC writer Grant Morrison, this alternate universe is not the pre-Crisis Earth-S.

In other media

Television
 The Marvel Family stars in the Shazam! segments of the 1981 Saturday-morning cartoon series The Kid Super Power Hour with Shazam!
 The Marvel Family (Captain Marvel, Mary Marvel and Captain Marvel Jr.) appear in the Batman: The Brave and the Bold episode "The Malicious Mr. Mind!". Batman and the Marvel Family face off against the Monster Society of Evil, which is first led by Doctor Sivana and then by Mister Mind.

Film
 In Justice League: Crisis on Two Earths, a 2010 animated film produced by Warner Bros. Animation, the Earth-3 supervillain Superwoman is the head of three "Made-Men" named Super Family styled after her own costume, low levels criminals (Each head of the Crime Syndicate has teams of several cronies). She shared her powers with these 3 men, who resemble Captain Marvel, Uncle Dudley Marvel, and Captain Marvel Jr. They are called Captain Super, Uncle Super, and Captain Super, Jr.
 The Flashpoint universe version of the Shazam Family (Billy, Mary, Freddy, Pedro, Eugene, and Darla) appear in Justice League: The Flashpoint Paradox, the 2013 animated film adaptation of the Flashpoint comic-book miniseries by Warner Bros. Animation.
 In Justice League: War, Freddy and Darla have cameo when they caught Billy sneaking back home after Billy snuck out to a Football, despite warnings that people were disappearing. They witness Billy transform and took off.

DC Extended Universe  
 Billy Batson / Shazam! and both the kid and adult identities of the Shazam Family (Mary, Freddy, Pedro, Eugene, and Darla) featured in the DC Extended Universe feature film Shazam! (2019), produced by New Line Cinema and Warner Bros. Pictures. The film featured Zachary Levi in the title role, Asher Angel as Billy Batson, Grace Fulton and Michelle Borth as Mary, Jack Dylan Grazer and Adam Brody as Freddy, Ian Chen and Ross Butler as Eugene, Jovan Armand and D. J. Cotrona as Pedro, and Faithe Herman and Meagan Good as Darla. Mary, Freddy, Eugene, Pedro and Darla are the first to see Billy in their foster family. Freddy and Darla are the first to discover that Billy Batson is Shazam and the others will find out later. Pedro was the one who discovered that Billy's biological mother, Marilyn, is two stops from the subway. While trying to escape from Doctor Sivana, Billy was about to surrender to Sivana in giving him the powers, he remembers the Wizard's words, Billy takes the staff from Sivana and uses it to share his powers, transforming his brothers and sisters into adult superheroes like him, before breaking the staff. After the Shazam Family battles the Seven Deadly Sins, Shazam removes the Eye of Sin from Sivana, leaving him unable to recapture the Seven Sins. Billy and his family are hailed as heroes and return the Eye and Seven Sins to their prisons. Billy and his siblings realize that the now-vacant Rock of Eternity may be their new lair and base of operations.
 The Shazam Family appeared in Shazam! Fury of the Gods. Billy, Mary, Freddy, Eugene, Pedro and Darla as heroes protect their city, but they hardly work well as a team by letting a bridge collapse. When they face the Daughters of Atlas, Hespera, Kalypso and Anthea, the 5 brothers (except Billy), lose their powers being taken away by Kalypso, who possesses the staff of the Wizard Shazam by preventing him from taking the Golden Apple, the seed of the Tree of Life, and they failed. Mary, Freddy, Eugene, Pedro and Darla having no powers, decide to help Billy and ride unicorns to fend off the Kalypso monsters that attack the city. After the defeat of Kalypso and her army of monsters, Billy has sacrificed himself and was taken to Anthea's kingdom for his funeral, until they see Wonder Woman, who uses the Wizard's staff to bring life back to revive the Gods' Realm and resurrect Billy, being with his family again and also to restore the powers of his brothers and those of Anthea and the Wizard, now living with them in their world.

Video games
 The Marvel Family are included in one of the DLC bundles for Lego DC Super-Villains.  Based on the Shazam! film, the "Shazam! Movie Level Pack 1 & 2" is broken into 'Sivana Escape' which focuses on Shazam's confrontation with Sivana in the department store, and 'Sivana Showdown' which focuses on the Family's final fight with Doctor Sivana and the Seven Deadly Sins at the Christmas fair. Purchasing these DLCs unlocks all of the film's versions of the Marvel Family, as well as their superhero counterparts, but only if the levels are finished. Each member has different powers both in their human and Shazam form, such as Darla being a Speedster type character, Pedro has super strength, and Eugene can summon a drone in his regular form.

References

External links
 Captain Marvel Culture: A history of the many Captains Marvel
 The Marvel Family Web

 
Comics characters introduced in 1942
DC Comics superhero teams
Golden Age comics titles
Golden Age superheroes
Characters created by C. C. Beck
Characters created by Otto Binder
Atlas (mythology)